3,4-Bis(trifluoromethyl)-1,2-dithiete is the organofluorine compound with the formula .  A yellow liquid, it is a stable 1,2-dithiete.  It arises by the reaction of hexafluoro-2-butyne with molten sulfur.

Bonding
Being planar with six pi-electrons, the compound is considered to be aromatic.  This description is supported by an electron diffraction study, which reveals an elongated C=C distance of 1.40 Å and shortened C-S distances of 1.73 Å.

Reactions
The compound tends to dimerize at room temperature, but the dimer cracks at higher temperature back to the dithiete. It is used to prepare metal dithiolene complexes.  It reacts with low valent metal complexes by oxidative addition:

References

Organosulfur compounds
Organic disulfides
Sulfur heterocycles
Four-membered rings